The Ace Matara Power Station is a  power station located in Matara, Sri Lanka. During its operations from 2002 to 2012, the plant utilized four   generating units. The plant was decommissioned in 2012 after its 10-year PPA expired and recommissioned in 2017.

See also 
 Embilipitiya Power Station
 Ace Horana Power Station
 List of power stations in Sri Lanka

References

External links 
 
 

Oil-fired power stations in Sri Lanka
Buildings and structures in Matara District
Former power stations in Sri Lanka